Sofía dame tiempo, was a Colombian telenovela produced by RTI for Caracol Televisión and Telemundo in 2003. It was a remake of the telenovela El último beso.

Cast 
 Karen Martínez as Sofía Santero
 Rafael Novoa as Santiago Rodríguez Salazar
 Ana María Trujillo as Francesca Sabina
 Alejandro López as Nicolás Pardo
 Orlando Fundichely as Antonio 'Toño' Rivas
 Ana Laverde as Valeria Sabina
 Mayte Vilán as Victoria Guerrero
 Salvo Basile as Salvatore Sabina
 Marcela Gallego as Fabiola de Neira
 Pedro Mogollón as Santos Neira
 Katherine Vélez as Adela Salazar viuda de Rodríguez
 Víctor Cifuentes as Gregorio Manrique
 Carlos Hurtado as Dairo García
 Astrid Hernández as Marilyn Monroy
 Orlando Lamboglia as Teodolindo 'Teo' Caro
 Cecilia Navia as Rosa Torres
 Claudia Liliana Gonzalez as Pilar Amaya
 Claudia Arroyave as Juliana Rodríguez Salazar
 Saín Castro as Aníbal Zapata
 Salvatore Cassandro as Chancho Panza
 Ramiro Meneses as Teniente Pinzón
 Santiago Alarcón as Rodrigo
 Juan del Mar as Diosdao
 Julio del Mar as José 'Pepe' Pardo
 Rosa Garavito as Ubaldina
 María José Martínez as Tatiana Neira
 Toto Vega as Sargento Díaz
 Rolando Tarajano as Manuel Manrique

External links 
 Sofía dame tiempo, en Terra
 Sofía dame tiempo en Colarte

Colombian telenovelas
Telemundo telenovelas
Caracol Televisión telenovelas
2003 telenovelas
American telenovelas
2003 American television series debuts
2003 American television series endings
2003 Colombian television series debuts
2003 Colombian television series endings
Spanish-language telenovelas
Television shows set in Bogotá